The Offer is an American biographical drama miniseries created by Michael Tolkin and developed by Tokin and Nikki Toscano for Paramount+. The series follows the development and production of Francis Ford Coppola's landmark gangster film The Godfather (1972) for Paramount Pictures. Miles Teller, Matthew Goode, Giovanni Ribisi, Colin Hanks, Dan Fogler, Juno Temple, and Burn Gorman all star. It premiered on April 28, 2022, and ran 10 episodes through June 16.

Cast

Main

Recurring

Guest

Episodes

Production
The project was announced in September 2020 to air on Paramount+, and for the story to be described from the perspective of producer Albert S. Ruddy. Armie Hammer was cast to play him in December 2020, but dropped out the following month; he was replaced by Miles Teller in May 2021. In April 2021, Dexter Fletcher was hired to direct several episodes. Matthew Goode, Giovanni Ribisi, Colin Hanks, Dan Fogler and Juno Temple joined the production in June, and in July, Burn Gorman joined as Charles Bludhorn. Justin Chambers has a recurring role as Marlon Brando. In October, Eric Balfour, Michael Gandolfini and Zack Schor joined the cast, with Balfour playing production designer Dean Tavoularis.

Filming for the series began in July 2021 but was paused on July 29 due to a positive COVID-19 test. On August 23, 2021, it was reported that plans to film at the Chateau Marmont hotel in Los Angeles between August 25 to 27 were scrapped after learning about a labor dispute there. The miniseries was released on April 28, 2022, with the first three episodes of the ten-episode miniseries available immediately and the rest debuting on a weekly basis on Thursdays.

Reception

 Metacritic, which uses a weighted average, assigned a score of 48 out of 100 based on 26 critics, indicating "mixed or average reviews".

References

External links
 
 

American biographical series
2020s American drama television miniseries
2022 American television series debuts
2022 American television series endings
Cultural depictions of Robert Evans
The Godfather
English-language television shows
Television series about filmmaking
Paramount+ original programming
Television series by Paramount Television
Television productions suspended due to the COVID-19 pandemic
Television series about show business